The Andean Railway (native name: Ferrocarril Andino) was a state-owned railway company in Argentina which, towards the end of the 19th century, built and operated a line connecting Villa María in Córdoba Province with the cities of Mendoza, San Luis and San Juan. The  network was later sold to a number of British-owned railway companies.

History 
The first plan to reach the Andes through railway had been carried out with a concession granted to Central Argentine Railway (CAR) and later with the project to make Buenos Aires Western Railway a trans-andean line. The aim of the railway was linking the three provinces of the Cuyo region, San Juan, San Luis and Mendoza with the city of Rosario, via the CAR.

The AR was the first state-owned railway in Argentina and was founded on 15 November 1867 by decree promulgated in November 1867, from Villa María to Villa Nueva, then extending to Río Cuarto.

At the beginning of 1870 the Government signed an agreement to British entrepreneur John Simmons who committed to finish the railway within 3 years at a cost of A$ 26,200 per mile. In November that same years works began.

On October 24, 1873, the Villa María–Río Cuarto section was finished. That same the company started works to extend the line to Villa Mercedes, San Luis, opening the line two years later, totalizing 254 km. President of Argentina Nicolás Avellaneda attended the ceremony.

Once the works finished, the National Government hired J. E. Rogers (whose company had been one of the constructors) to operate the line. The Government required Rogers his employees had to be Argentina-born.

Details of the building of the line are as follows:

In 1886 the AR bought the branch line from Villa Mercedes to La Toma from the ex-Ferrocarril Noroeste a La Rioja and extended it to Villa Dolores to give a branch line with a total length of 226 km.

The construction costs and tariffs of the AR were the lowest of any railway company in Argentina at that time, and when it began to make a profit, the network was sold off to British-owned companies as detailed in Table 2.

See also 
 Transandine Railway

Bibliography 
 British Railways in Argentina 1857-1914: A Case Study of Foreign Investment by Colin Lewis - Athlone Press (for the Institute of Latin American Studies, University of London), 1983

Defunct railway companies of Argentina
Railway companies established in 1867
Railway companies disestablished in 1909
5 ft 6 in gauge railways in Argentina
a
a
a